Neocolonial dependence is an indirect outgrowth of Marxist thinking which is a subgroup of development economics. According to this doctrine, third world underdevelopment is viewed as the result of highly unequal international capitalist system or rich country-poor country relationships.

Marxist theory 
Unlike the Stage Theories or the Structural Change Models of economic development, which considered underdevelopment as a result of internal constraints such as insufficient savings, investment or lack of infrastructure, skill or education, the proponents of the Neocolonial Dependence model portray third world underdevelopment as an externally induced phenomenon. 

According to the theory of Neocolonial Dependence, rich countries hurt the developing countries through their intentionally exploitative or unintentionally neglectful policies. The rich countries and a small elite ruling class in the developing countries, who serve as the agent of the rich countries, are responsible for the perpetuation of underdevelopment in the developing countries.

Establishment of Communist regimes 

The remedy, according to those who preached these ideas, was to initiate revolutionary struggles to topple the existing elite of the developing countries and the restructuring of the world capitalist system to free the third world nations from the direct and indirect control of their first world and domestic oppressors via the establishment of Communist regimes. Although this states the direct establishment of communists and may not feel suitable to capitalists.

See also 
 Proletarian internationalism
 World communism

References 
https://www.investopedia.com/terms/m/marxism.asp

External links 
The neo-colonial dependence model and the diverging economic paths of Chile and Argentina

Decolonization
Marxian economics
Imperialism studies